Virginio De Paoli (22 June 1938 – 24 August 2009) was an Italian professional football player and coach who played as a striker.

Honours
Juventus
 Serie A champion: 1966–67.

References

External links
 

1938 births
2009 deaths
Italian footballers
Italy international footballers
Italian football managers
Serie A players
Serie B players
S.S.D. Varese Calcio players
Pisa S.C. players
Venezia F.C. players
Brescia Calcio players
Juventus F.C. players

Association football forwards